Bharat Samachar is a TV channel owned by Time Today Media Network Private Limited according to MIB. The channel was relaunched in 2017 as a local Hindi news channel focusing U.P. from Lucknow. It was named in Cobrapost's sting operation in which it agree to endorse Hindutva and attack on BSP, SP and Congress in 2018.

Sting operation by Cobrapost
Under Operation 136 : Part II released by Cobrapost on 25 May 2018, Marketing and Sales Head along with Editor-in-Chief and Owner of Bharat Samachar agree to promote firebrand Hindutva leaders and attack Bahujan Samaj Party, Samajwadi Party and Congress. 
The media houses named in the undercover investigation include Times of India, India Today, Hindustan Times, Zee News, Network 18, Star India, Paytm, Bharat Samachar, ABP News, Dainik Jagaran, Radio One, Red FM, Lokmat, ABN Andhra Jyothy, TV5, Dinamalar, Big FM, K News, India Voice, The New Indian Express, MVTV and Open magazine. The portal disclosed how Bartaman Patrika and Daikik Sambad declined to distribute content with religious undercurrent.

Income Tax Department raid
The Income Tax Department raided premises of Bharat Samachar in July 2021. As per department, 3 crore cash was seized and 200 crore unaccounted transactions were unearthed along with 15 shell companies for Money laundering.

References

External links
 

Hindi-language television channels in India
Television channels and stations established in 2015
Hindi-language television stations
Television channels based in Lucknow
2015 establishments in Uttar Pradesh